2012 in Uzbekistani football involves the national competitions of the Uzbekistani football league system and the national team.

Domestic leagues

Promotion and relegation
Relegated from Uzbek League
Sogdiana Jizzakh

Promoted to Uzbek League
Lokomotiv Tashkent

Uzbek League

Uzbekistan First League

Domestic cups

Uzbekistan Cup

National team

Men

Women

Awards

Coach and Player of Month

Coach of Month and Player of Month monthly awards given to Best Performed Coach and Player of Month and organised by UFF after mass-media sport journalists survey.

References